Oxly is a census-designated place in southeastern Ripley County, Missouri, United States. It is located on Logan Creek along Missouri Route 142, approximately seven miles east of Doniphan. 

A post office called Oxly has been in operation since 1900. The community has the name of F. G. Oxley, a businessperson in the local lumber industry.

Climate
Climate is characterized by relatively high temperatures and evenly distributed precipitation throughout the year.  The Köppen Climate Classification subtype for this climate is "Cfa" (Humid Subtropical Climate).

References

Census-designated places in Ripley County, Missouri